Main Avenue Historic District in Durango, Colorado is a  historic district that was listed on the National Register of Historic Places in 1980.

According to its 1980 NRHP nomination, it was deemed significant "because it represents the essence and core of both the evolution and development of business and commerce in the most important town in southwestern Colorado."

In 1980 it included 104 buildings:  86 buildings deemed to contribute to the historic character of the area, 12 non-contributing but compatible modern buildings, and 6 negative intrusions.  It was felt that "together these buildings still maintain the feelings, associations, and ambiance of a turn-of-the-century commercial district."

The nine buildings then deemed most important are:
(on the odd side)
Gold Slipper (1900), 645 Main, originally built as an Adolph Coors bottling plant
Strater Hotel (1887), 699 Main, an architecturally eclectic Victorian four-story building
Main Mall, 835 Main, a modern building designed compatibly which holds about 35 businesses, which replaced several buildings destroyed in a 1975 fire.
Newman Block (1897), at 801-813 Main Ave., which was separately listed on the NRHP in 1979.
Gardenswartz Building (1901), 871 Main 
Central Hotel (1899), 975 Main
Main Street Furnishings (1889), 1015 Main 
and on the even side
Burns Bank (1892), 900 Main 
Old Post Office Building (1928), 1090-8 Main

Others include:
Palmer House hotel
First National Bank (1892), 901 Main Ave.
Woolworths (1859)

References

Geography of La Plata County, Colorado
Durango, Colorado
Historic districts on the National Register of Historic Places in Colorado
National Register of Historic Places in La Plata County, Colorado